Aovere is a village in Tartu Parish, Tartu County, Estonia. As of 2011 Census, the settlement's population was 96.

References

Villages in Tartu County
Tartu Parish